Two warships of Japan have been named Mikuma:

 , a  launched in 1934 and sunk in 1942
 , a  launched in 1971 and stricken in 1997
 , a  launched in 2021.

Japanese Navy ship names